"The Wreck of the Nancy Lee" (1931) is a comic song, words and music by Arthur Le Clerq. Sheet music published in London in 1932 billed it as "He Played his Ukulele as the Ship Went Down: a comedy foxtrot".  It has been recorded by Clinton Ford, and in March 1932 by Leslie Holmes and by Leslie Sarony.

The chorus is as follows:

'All the crew was in despair,
Some rushed here and others rushed there,
But the Captain sat in the Captain's chair,
And he played his ukulele as the ship went down.'

References

External links
 Lyrics and recording by Tom Lewis

Comedy songs
1932 songs
Songs about boats